Kin Sang is an at-grade MTR Light Rail stop located at Leung Wan Street in Tuen Mun District, near Kin Sang Shopping Centre in Kin Sang Estate. It began service on 24 September 1988 and belongs to Zone 3. It serves the Kin Sang Estate and nearby residential buildings.

References

MTR Light Rail stops
Former Kowloon–Canton Railway stations
Tuen Mun District
Railway stations in Hong Kong opened in 1988
MTR Light Rail stops named from housing estates